Hybosorus roei is a species of scavenger scarab beetle in the family Hybosoridae. It is found in North America. Adults feed on carrion in its early stages of decomposition of both vertebrae and invertebrate.  Their size ranges from 7-9 mm.

References

Further reading

External links

 

scarabaeiformia
Articles created by Qbugbot
Beetles described in 1845